Blaculla is an extinct genus of shrimp. It existed during the Late Jurassic period, and contains the species Blaculla brevipes, Blaculla felthausetsauteri, Blaculla nikoides and Blaculla sieboldi.

References

Caridea
Jurassic crustaceans